Bukit Timah Road is a major road in Singapore extending from the city centre to Woodlands Road on the way to Johor Bahru in Malaysia. The road has a length of 25 km (15.5 miles), which makes it one of the longest roads in Singapore, and the road takes its name from the hill. En route, it passes through the areas of Little India, Newton Road, Farrer Road, Singapore Botanic Gardens and Bukit Timah.

Bukit Timah Road splits into two roads at Newton Circus, the west-bound Bukit Timah Road and east-bound Dunearn Road, both of which straddle a canal along their entire lengths. Bukit Timah Road begins at the junction with Rochor Canal Road, Serangoon Road and Selegie Road just south of Tekka Centre as Bukit Timah Road, follows a canal in a northwest direction up to its junction with Clementi Road where it continues northwards as Upper Bukit Timah Road until the junction with Bukit Panjang Road and Choa Chu Kang Road near the Ten Mile Junction shopping mall then continues with Woodlands Road. The road passes through the Bukit Timah Planning Area. Buildings named after the road are Bukit Timah Plaza and Bukit Timah Shopping Centre. This road is also affected with the North-South Expressway construction nearby.

Etymology

"Bukit Timah" in Malay means "tin bearing hill".

History
The British surrendered to the Japanese at the Old Ford Motor Factory at Upper Bukit Timah Road. A canal was built in later years between Dunearn Road and Bukit Timah Road to solve the flooding problem in the area. In the 1990s, a tunnel and a flyover was constructed namely the Bukit Timah Underpass and the Wayang Satu Flyover in order to improve traffic flow. The Newton Flyover was built in the 1970s which goes over the junction of Newton Circus becoming the first ever Semi-Expressway standalone road, that features both the underpass and flyover without changing any direction.

Landmarks
Along the road, major landmarks include Tan Kah Kee MRT Station, Anglo-Chinese School (Barker Road), Balmoral Plaza, Coronation Plaza, Hwa Chong Institution, Sixth Avenue MRT station, Kandang Kerbau Women's and Children's Hospital, Kampong Java Park, King Albert Park, Little India MRT station, Hwa Chong International School, Methodist Girls' School, National Junior College, Nanyang Girls' High School, Newton Food Centre, Newton, Singapore Botanic Gardens, Singapore Institute of Management, Tekka Centre, Ngee Ann Polytechnic at the junction of Clementi Road and Upper Bukit Timah Road and at Upper Bukit Timah Road, landmarks include Bukit Timah Plaza, Bukit Timah Market and Food Centre, Beauty World, Cheong Chin Nam Road, Hoover Park, The Rail Mall and the Old Ford Motor Factory.

Businesses and organisations
Businesses and organisations located along Bukit Timah Road include:
 Blade Club, a fencing club

References

 Victor R Savage, Brenda S A Yeoh (2004), Toponymics A Study of Singapore Street Names, Eastern University Press, 

Roads in Singapore
Bukit Timah
Kallang
Newton, Singapore
Novena, Singapore
Rochor
Tanglin